It's Not Her Name, also known as Another Name (Original title: У нее другое имя) is a 2022 Russian thriller drama film directed by Veta Geraskina, from a screenplay by Lilya Akopyan and Veta Geraskina. It stars Svetlana Khodchenkova, Jakob Diehl, and introducing Katya Fedina. The films concept was presented at the 72nd International Cannes Film Festival. The film is now in post-production.

Synopsis 
It's Not Her Name is about a woman Lisa who abandoned her child at birth and now twenty-three years later she obsessively tries to find her child. Lisa's search leads her to a young girl that she believes to be the one that she left at an orphanage. Lisa begins to spy on her and invades her life even though later she will find out the truth, that this is not her daughter. But, Lisa will not be able to stop being the mother figure that she has now become. And, like a ruthless wolf she will not let anything stand in her way of saving her "child". Two lonely souls that find a family in each other, one became a mother and the other a daughter. What is the price that they will have to pay for this encounter? The film explores the forces that possess people like demons making them strive towards their goal without boundaries, sometimes leaving a bloody trail behind. (Synopsis by Vera Geraskina)

Cast 
 Svetlana Khodchenkova as Lisa
 Jakob Diehl as Petr
 Ekaterina "Katya" Fedina as Lisa's daughter
 Alexandra Krotkova as Ulya

Production 
In January 2019 it was announced that Svetlana Khodchenkova and Jakob Diehl had joined the cast of the film. Khodchenkova is an ambassador to the brand Bulgari. The film is produced by Konstantin Fam, Svetlana Khodchenkova, Katerina Mikhaylova, Polina Schlicht, and Oxana Shalamanova.

Filming 
Principal photography began in March 2019.

References

External links 

2020s Russian-language films
2022 thriller drama films
Russian thriller drama films